Kobyakov is a Russian masculine surname, its feminine counterpart is Kobyakova. Notable people with the surname include:

Andrei Kobyakov (born 1960), formerly Prime Minister of Belarus
Arkady Kobyakov (1976–2015), Russian singer

Russian-language surnames